Aleksandr Demidov is a Russian actor, screenwriter, camera operator and film producer. Merited Artist of the Russian Federation.

Selected filmography

References

External links 
 Aleksandr Demidov on kino-teatr.ru

1970 births
Living people
Russian male film actors
21st-century Russian male actors